Rear Admiral Rajesh Dhankhar, NM is a serving Flag officer in the Indian Navy. He currently serves as the Commandant of the Naval War College, Goa. He earlier served as the Flag Officer Sea Training and commanded the aircraft carrier  from 2019 to 2020.

Naval career
Dhankhar was commissioned into the Indian Navy on 1 July 1990. He is a specialist in Navigation and Direction. He spent his early years onboard frontline warships as the navigating and operations officer. He has served as an instructor at the Project 15 training team in Mumbai. He attended the Defence Services Staff College, Wellington. He also served as an instructor at the Mids Wing of the Officer Cadet School in Singapore and at the Navigation and Direction School in Kochi.

Dhankar commanded the Magar-class amphibious warfare vessel . In 2011, he attended the Higher Command Course at the Japan Maritime Self Defense Force Command and Staff College in Tokyo. He served as the executive officer and the principal warfare officer of the lead ship of her class of guided missile destroyers .

He then commanded Delhi's sister ship . Mumbai was deployed as part of Operation Raahat to provide protection and support to Indian ships and aircraft involved in the evacuation of Indian citizens from Yemen during the military intervention. For this operation, he was awarded the Nao Sena Medal for gallantry. As a staff officer, he served in the Directorate of Naval Plans at Naval headquarters. In September 2019, Dhankar took over as the 5th commanding officer of the aircraft carrier . He subsequently served as the Principal Director of Personnel at NHQ, in the rank of Commodore.

Flag rank
Dhankar was promoted to flag rank in February 2021 and was appointed Chief Staff Officer (Training) (CSO (Trg)) at the Southern Naval Command headquarters in Kochi. After a short stint, he took over as the Flag Officer Sea Training (FOST) also at Kochi. As FOST, his charter included the conduct of the operational sea training of all ships of the Indian Navy and the Indian Coast Guard. On 18 May 2022, he was appointed Commandant of the Naval War College, Goa. He took over from Rear Admiral Sai Venkat Raman.

Awards and decorations

See also
 Flag Officer Sea Training

References 

Indian Navy admirals
Living people
Year of birth missing (living people)
Defence Services Staff College alumni
Flag Officers Sea Training
Commandants of Naval War College, Goa
Recipients of the Nau Sena Medal